Yawara! (stylized as YAWARA! in Japan) is a Japanese manga series by Naoki Urasawa which ran in Big Comic Spirits from 1986 to 1993. In 1989, Yomiuri TV began broadcasting an anime adaptation entitled Yawara! A Fashionable Judo Girl!, which ran from October 16, 1989, through September 21, 1992 for a total of 124 episodes. Each episode ended with a countdown to the number of days remaining to the start of the Barcelona Olympics. The anime, produced by Kitty Film with animation by the Madhouse studio, aired on Japanese television contemporary with Kitty's Ranma ½, but achieved higher ratings than Ranma ½, despite the latter series' being more well known outside Japan. AnimEigo licensed the TV series for North American distribution in August 2006. However, as of April 2010 AnimEigo has been unable to license the remaining episodes of the TV series for North American distribution.

Themes
 : Eps. 01 - 43
 Lyrics by: Takashi Matsumoto
 Composition by: Wataru Yahagi
 Arrangement by: Mitsuo Hagita
 Song by: Rika Himenogi
 : Eps. 44 - 81
 Lyrics and composition by: Midori Karashima
 Arrangement by: Kei Wakakusa
 Song by: Midori Karashima
 : Eps. 82 - 102
 Lyrics and composition by: Yuko Hara
 Arrangement by: Takeshi Kobayashi, Keisuke Kuwata
 Song by: Yuko Hara
 : Eps. 103 - 124
 Lyrics and composition by: LOU
 Arrangement by: Akihisa Matsura, LAZY LOU's BOOGIE
 Song by: LAZY LOU's BOOGIE

Episodes

References

External links
 Official Madhouse website 
 Official Fuji TV website 

Yawara!